Daniel Ola (born 23 November 1982) is a Ghanaian-Nigerian football defender who plays for Italian club Ginosa.

Career 

His name "Ola" means "Wealth" in Yoruba. Ola began his career with King Faisal Babes.

He came to Europe in 1999 and played in Switzerland for Carouge before June 2000 when he was scouted by S.S. Lazio and he joined the club's reserves. The Roma based club played in the UEFA Champions League in 2000.

In 2001 Ola left the club and moved to Chievo. After 6 months he left Verona and moved to L'Aquila and played 45 games, and scored 3 goals in the Serie C1 as well.

In 2003, he was transferred to Teramo. He was sold to Cesena in co-ownership deal in summer 2007.

Ola left the club in the summer of 2008 and one year later he signed a contract with Bulgarian club Botev Plovdiv. In May 2010 he joined Persebaya.  In April 2011 he joined the Latvian side FC Jūrmala.

In August 2012, Ola was loaned to another Latvian Higher League club Daugava Daugavpils. He scored 2 goals in 14 matches and helped his team become the champions of Latvia. After the 2012 season his contract with Jūrmala expired, and Ola joined Daugava Daugavpils on permanent basis, helping the club win the Latvian Supercup in the beginning of the year.

In February 2014, Ola was transferred to the Romanian Liga II club UTA Arad alongside his former Daugava teammate Stanley Ibe. Their club was relegated to the Liga III after the season.

In September 2014, Ola signed a 1-year deal with the Serie D side Fidelis Andria, winning the championship and being promoted to Lega Pro.

At the end of the season Ola became a free agent; in July 2015 he signed with the Italian Serie D side Bisceglie.

International career 

His first call on 5 August 2008 was to the Nigeria national football team against South Africa. He was an unused substitute.

References

External links
Player Profile

1982 births
Living people
Association football defenders
Expatriate footballers in Italy
Expatriate footballers in Switzerland
Expatriate footballers in Bulgaria
Expatriate footballers in Latvia
Expatriate footballers in Romania
L'Aquila Calcio 1927 players
A.C. ChievoVerona players
A.C. Cesena players
S.S. Lazio players
S.S. Teramo Calcio players
Botev Plovdiv players
Étoile Carouge FC players
FC Jūrmala players
FC Daugava players
FC UTA Arad players
Serie B players
First Professional Football League (Bulgaria) players
Ghanaian expatriate sportspeople in Italy
Ghanaian expatriate sportspeople in Bulgaria
Ghanaian expatriate sportspeople in Latvia
Ghanaian expatriate sportspeople in Romania
Footballers from Accra
Ghanaian people of Nigerian descent
Ghanaian people of Yoruba descent
Yoruba sportspeople
S.S. Fidelis Andria 1928 players
A.S. Bisceglie Calcio 1913 players
Ghanaian footballers